Hyalurga subnormalis is a moth of the family Erebidae. It was described by Harrison Gray Dyar Jr. in 1914. It is found in Panama.

References

 Arctiidae genus list at Butterflies and Moths of the World of the Natural History Museum

Hyalurga
Moths described in 1914